Elisavet "Elli" Mystakidou (born 14 August 1977 in Giannitsa) is a Greek taekwondo practitioner and Olympic medalist. She participated in the 2004 Summer Olympics in Athens where she earned a silver medal in the under 67 kg division.

Mystakidou also won three bronze medals at the 1993, 2001 and 2003 World Taekwondo Championships. In the 2008 Summer Olympics, she lost her debut against Asunción Ocasio of Puerto Rico.

References
 
 
 

1977 births
Living people
Greek female taekwondo practitioners
Taekwondo practitioners at the 2004 Summer Olympics
Taekwondo practitioners at the 2008 Summer Olympics
Olympic silver medalists for Greece
Olympic taekwondo practitioners of Greece
Olympic medalists in taekwondo
Medalists at the 2004 Summer Olympics
World Taekwondo Championships medalists
Sportspeople from Giannitsa
20th-century Greek women
21st-century Greek women